Grammatotheca is a genus of plants in the Campanulaceae. It has only one known species, Grammatotheca bergiana, native to South Africa but naturalized in Western Australia.

References

External links

Lobelioideae
Endemic flora of South Africa
Monotypic Campanulaceae genera
Taxa named by Carl Borivoj Presl